The Canadian Auto Workers (CAW; formally the National Automobile, Aerospace, Transportation and General Workers Union of Canada) was one of Canada's largest and highest profile labour unions. In 2013, it merged with the Communications, Energy and Paperworkers Union of Canada, forming a new union, Unifor. While rooted in Ontario's large auto plants of Windsor, Brampton, Oakville, St. Catharines, and Oshawa, the CAW has expanded and now incorporates workers in almost every sector of the economy. The presidents of the CAW were Bob White (1985-1992), Buzz Hargrove (1992-2008), Ken Lewenza (2008-2013), and Jerry Dias (2013–2022) when the CAW became UNIFOR.

History

Split from UAW
The CAW began as the Canadian Region of the United Auto Workers (UAW).

The UAW was founded in August 1935, and the Canadian Region of the UAW was established in 1937 following the 1937 GM Oshawa strike at General Motors's Oshawa, Ontario plant. The Canadian Region of the UAW unionized the Ford Motor Company in 1945 after a major strike which established the right of Canadian labour union members to union dues checkoff. George Burt was the Canadian Director of the United Auto Workers (UAW) from 1939 to 1968. He is the longest-serving leader of the Canadian Union at 29 years. He pioneered many contractual issues that affected Canadian auto workers in the early years of the union movement.

The reasons for the CAW split from the UAW are complicated. Holmes and Rusonik (1990) contend that although the Canadian labour movement has been seen as traditionally more militant than its American counterpart, it was in fact the uneven geographical development of both management and labour led the Canadian auto-workers to develop a distinctly different set of collective bargaining objectives, which placed them in a far stronger bargaining position as compared to the UAW in the U.S., and, ultimately, brought about the events that led directly to the Split.
Two of the main forces demanding the restructuring of management and Labour during this time were the rise of Japan as a major automotive force, and the general recession of the world economy in the late 1970s and early 1980s. Aided by the Auto Pact and the weakening Canadian dollar in relation to the United States dollar, a geographic difference developed which provided some relief to many Canadian auto-workers.

By December 1984, significant differences in the value of negotiated contracts, and divergent union objectives had set the stage for the creation of the CAW, a process documented in the Genie Award winning film, Final Offer. In 1984, the Canadian section of the UAW, under the leadership of Bob White and his assistants Buzz Hargrove and Bob Nickerson, broke from the UAW, led by Owen Bieber, because the American union was seen as giving away too much in the way of concessions during collective bargaining. Additionally, the UAW had been lobbying the U.S. Congress to force the transfer of auto production from Canada to the U.S. and the Canadian branch felt there was a lack of a representative voice during UAW's conventions. By  1985 the split from the American union was complete and Bob White was acclaimed as the first President of the CAW. He served three terms as president..

Politics
After separation, the CAW began to grow quickly in size and stature. It merged with a number of smaller unions to double in size and become the largest private sector union in the country. Most notable were the mergers with the Fishermen, Food, and Allied Workers and the Canadian Brotherhood of Railway Transport and General Workers (see CAW National Council 4000. The CAW also voiced strong opposition to the then-federal government of Prime Minister Brian Mulroney and such policies as the Goods and Services Tax and free trade.

In the case Fullowka et al. v. Royal Oak Ventures Inc, held in the aftermath of an 18-month strike at Royal Oak Mines in Yellowknife, the CAW was originally held responsible for 22% of damages at trial, before CAW was successful on appeal. The trial judge found that the union breached its duty of care by doing nothing to stop illegal acts during the strike, paying fines and legal fees for striking miners, providing a person to assist the miners' union who prolonged the strike, and failing to bargain in good faith. At trial, the court ruled that the cumulative effect of these breaches of the duty of care were found to have materially contributed to Roger Warren's bombing of the mine, which killed nine strikebreaking workers. Warren, a union member who had been fired from Royal Oak, testified that he was only capable of the bombing because strike-breakers had been "dehumanized" by the union and was sentenced to life in prison. However, these findings of liability were overturned on appeal by the Northwest Territories Court of Appeal and a decision by the Supreme Court of Canada was dismissed. Furthermore, CAW members Al Shearing and Tim Bettger were sentenced to two and a half and three years in prison, respectively. Both were convicted of painting anti-scab graffiti and setting an explosion in a ventilation shaft on June 29, 1992. Bettger was sentenced to an additional six months in prison for blowing a hole in a television satellite dish September 1 of that year. (The unioned miners were part of the Canadian Association of Smelter and Allied Workers union (CASAW) Local 4 at the time of the strike, and merged into the CAW in May 1994.)

In 1998, the CAW was deeply involved in discussions with Volvo Canada Ltd. and the Government of Nova Scotia over the closure of the Volvo Halifax Assembly plant. In 2000, the CAW was expelled from the Canadian Labour Congress when several union locals left the SEIU and joined the CAW, prompting accusations of union raiding. A settlement was reached a year later that allowed the CAW to rejoin the national labour federation but relations with other unions such as the International Brotherhood of Teamsters, the United Steel Workers of America and SEIU remain strained and the CAW remains outside of the Ontario Federation of Labour.

The CAW's relationship with other unions has also been strained due to its different political direction. The CAW is strongly left leaning and it has traditionally been a strong supporter of the New Democratic Party (NDP) and the Bloc Québécois. However, under former leader Buzz Hargrove, it began lending its support to the Liberal Party in ridings which the NDP were unlikely to win in the recent federal elections.

The CAW has attempted several times, all unsuccessful, to organize Toyota Motor Manufacturing Canada. TMMC Assistant General Manager and spokesman Greig Mordue stated  "Our team members will decide whether or not a union best reflects their interest... At this point in time, we don't think they have anything to gain from a union", and described the defeat of the union drive saying "Our team members have recognized that a third party represents a complication they don't need." Despite this, however, the CAW supported Mordue as the Liberal candidate in the 2006 federal election instead of endorsing the NDP's Zoe Kunschner. Mordue attempted to take credit for bringing the new plant to Woodstock, but lost to Conservative incumbent Dave MacKenzie.

The 2006 federal election saw the governing Liberals lose power, despite CAW support. Afterwards, the Ontario NDP voted to expel Hargrove for supporting the Liberals, which automatically suspended his membership in the federal party. The CAW retaliated by severing all union ties with the NDP, a move formalized at the CAW's 2006 convention.

2008-2010 automotive crisis

Industry analyst Anthony Faria has criticized the labour contracts that Canadian Auto Workers then-president Buzz Hargrove negotiated with the Big Three US automobile manufacturers in 2007, predicting that the subprime mortgage crisis and currency would hit Canadian auto production especially hard. Faria noted that UAW president Ron Gettelfinger agreed to have the UAW's "all-in" wage, benefit and pension costs drop from a high of $75.86 per hour in 2007 to an average of about $51 per hour starting in 2010. By comparison, the CAW's cost per hour was $77 in 2007 and will rise to over $80 per hour by the end of the new contract. Faria said that Gettelfinger went into negotiations "with the right intention...Save jobs. The CAW strategy was to squeeze every dime out of them." Hargrove was said to have "instilled backbone and an attitude that the union could always make the auto makers buckle at the bargaining table".

Current union president Ken Lewenza has argued that labour is not responsible for the bankruptcy crisis facing the Big Three automakers, saying that his members would not make concessions part of any taxpayer-funded bailout. Lawenza argued that the CAW agreed in 2007 to make concessions that will save the Big Three $900 million over three years.

A spokesman for the Canadian Taxpayers Federation has criticized the CAW's "no-concession" stance, saying that it only serves to strengthen the opposition to a taxpayer-funded bailout for the struggling Detroit Three automakers. The CTF further pointed out that "It is especially difficult to understand anyone asking for government help that refuses to do anything to help itself to begin with", since they "fail to realize they've existed at the substantial largesse of taxpayers for decades". Kelly McParland, a columnist for the National Post, has suggested that "if he won't give anything, he and his members are likely to lose everything." He also said that the problem facing the North American auto industry was borne equally by management and labour alike, criticizing labour for building up pay and benefits for themselves that was as unsustainable as it was enviable, while attacking management for its short-term strategy of selling gas-guzzling trucks and sales tactics (price cuts, rebates, free gas and cash-back schemes).

The CTF has opposed the proposed CAD $3.5 billion bailout for Canadian subsidiaries of the Big Three, saying that it was an unfair financial burden on the average Canadian, as well as another excuse for the Detroit automakers to postpone much needed change. The CTF noted that federal and provincial governments spent $782-million in the past five years on the Big Three, saying "These have been a bottomless pit of requests for cash". Lewenza disagreed, saying that the bailout should be seen by Canadians as a loan that will be paid back when the country's economy is prosperous again.

On December 20, the governments of Canada and Ontario offered $3.3 billion in loans to the auto industry. Under the plan GM was to receive $3 billion and Chrysler was to receive the rest. Ford only asked for a line of credit but did not be participating in the bailout.

The CAW negotiated a cost-cutting deal with General Motors Canada on March 8, 2009. The deal would extend the current contract for an additional year to September 2012, and preserves the current average assembly-worker base pay of about $34 an hour. It would eliminate a $1,700 annual "special bonus," and reduce special paid absences or "SPA days" from two weeks to one week a year, while maintaining vacation entitlements which range up to six weeks a year for high-seniority workers. The deal also introduced payments by members toward their health benefits - $30 monthly per family for workers and $15 a month for pensioners. Lewenza said it also would trim by 35 per cent company contributions to union-provided programs such as child care and wellness programs. Lewenza called the package a "major sacrifice." However, observers noted that the deal did not go far enough; Dominion Bond Rating Service analyst Kam Hon described it as "not material." Automotive industry consultant Dennis DesRosiers said that General Motors had missed the chance to slash labour costs, pointing out that bankruptcy was a looming threat, Ottawa and Queen's Park demanded cuts to the labour bill as a condition of the bailout, and that the deficit to the pension fund would prevent the CAW from striking. He estimated the total hourly cost of a GM Canada worker, including benefits, is $75 to $78, and saying that "they [GM] got six or seven." when it should have been cut by $20. DesRosiers also said giving up cost-of-living increases is not significant when inflation is nearly non-existent and added that the 40-hour reduction in paid time off merely means "five fewer spa days." University of Toronto professor Joe D'Cruz calculated that it would save $148 million a year, though GM is seeking $6 billion in Canadian government support. CAW autoworkers with seniority were able to maintain 10 weeks of vacation with full pay, while not contributing to their pension fund, relying instead on taxpayers (including these without pensions) to help make up their unfunded liabilities.

The agreement is contingent on Canada being allocated 20% of GM's North American, and getting billions of dollars in federal and provincial taxpayer support, which Lewenza stressed will be loans. However, some suggested that this would not be the final time that automakers would request a bailout.
Dennis DesRosiers estimated that GM will go through its government loans in a couple of quarters, long before any recovery in the market. Furthermore, GM Canada president Arturo Elias had admitted to MP Frank Valeriote that GM had pledged all its assets worldwide to the U.S. government in order to secure the first tranche of a US$30 billion loan, leaving no assets to collateralize the $6 billion loan from the Canadian government. The Canadian Taxpayers' Federation noted that between 1982 and 2005, Ottawa handed out over $18.2 billion to corporations, of which only $7.1 billion was repayable, and only $1.3 billion was ever repaid.

Chrysler vice-chairman and president Thomas W. LaSorda (himself the son of a CAW official) and Ford's chief of manufacturing Joe Hinrichs said that the GM-CAW deal was insufficient, suggesting that they would break the CAW's negotiating pattern set by GM. LaSorda told the House of Commons of Canada finance committee that he would demand an hourly wage cut of $20, suggested that Chrysler may withdraw from Canada if it fails to achieve more substantial cost savings from the CAW.

On March 31, 2009, the Canadian federal and Ontario governments jointly rejected the restructuring plans submitted by GM and Chrysler. This came a day after US President Barack Obama had rejected the plans of their parent companies. Both federal Industry Minister Tony Clement and Ontario Premier Dalton McGuinty suggested the CAW's initial deal was insufficient in cutting costs and the union had return to the bargaining table to make further concessions. Both governments maintained that these were needed to make the business viable in order justify the use of taxpayers' money.
 Fiat CEO Sergio Marchionne has asked that CAW wages be reduced to the levels of non-unionized workers from Honda and Toyota operating in Canada, or else they would walk away from the proposed alliance with Chrysler, resulting in the latter being forced into bankruptcy.

Following its emergence from Chapter 11, Chrysler returned to profitability, repaying some of its government loans.

Unifor
The Canadian Auto Workers voted in October 2012 to merge with the Communications, Energy and Paperworkers Union of Canada. The new merged union, Unifor, held its founding convention in August 2013.

CAW leaders

Canadian Directors of the UAW
Charles Millard (1937–1939)
George Burt (1939–1968)
Dennis McDermott (1968–1978)
Bob White (1978–1985)

Presidents of the Canadian Auto Workers
Bob White (1985–1992)
Buzz Hargrove (1992–2008)
Ken Lewenza (2008–2013)

Major CAW employers

Major auto
 General Motors of Canada – Local 195, 199, 222, 636, 1001,
 Ford Motor Company of Canada – Local 200, 240, 707, 1520 CAW Local 584
 Chrysler Canada – Local 144, 195, 432, 444, 1090, 1285, 1459,
 CAMI Automotive – Local 88

Aerospace
 Pratt and Whitney – Local 510
 Bombardier/de Havilland – Local 112
 Boeing Canada – Local 1967, CAW Local 2169
 CMC Electronics
 IMP Group
 Magellan Aerospace/Bristol – Local 3005
 Cascade Aerospace Inc - CAW Local 114

Specialty vehicles
 GM/General Dynamics (London) – Local 27
 Bombardier (Thunder Bay/Kingston)
 New Flyer Industries (Winnipeg) – Local 3003
 Paccar/Kenworth (Que.)
 Hitachi Construction Truck Manu (Guelph, Ontario) - CAW Local 1917

Shipbuilding
 Halifax Shipyard– CAW/MWF Local 1
 Marystown Shipyard
 Shelburne Ship Repair

Electrical and electronics
 Camco
 General Electric– Local 3003
 Westinghouse
 Nortel Networks

General manufacturing
 3M Canada - CAW Local 27
 Collins and Aikman Plastics
 MTD Products
 Atlas Steels
 Collins and Aikman Plastics
 Honeywell Specialty Chemicals Amherstburg — Local 89
 Kautex Textron
 McGregor Hosiery Mills – Local 40
 Parmalat – Local 462
 Nestlé Enterprises – Local 252
 Bazaar and Novelty – Local 462
 Guelph Products
 LTV Copperweld – Local 636
 PepsiCo Foods – Local 1996
 St. Anne Nackawic Pulp Co. – Local 219
 Scanwood Canada Ltd. - National Council 4000
 Selkirk Canada Corporation Stoney Creek facility – Local 504
 RockTenn - (Guelph, ON) - CAW Local 1917
 CPK Interior Products - (CPK IP) - (Guelph, ON) CAW Local 1917
 Concast Pipe - (Guelph, ON) - CAW Local 1917
 Ventra Plastics - (Peterborough, ON)  CAW Local 1987

Air transportation
 Air Canada and Regional – Local 2002
 Nav Canada – Local 2245, 5454, 1016
 Worldwide Flight Services– Local 2002
 Handlex (Air Transat) – Local 2002
 First Air – Local 2002

Railways
 Canadian National Railway – Local 100, National Council 4000
 Canadian Pacific Railway – Local 101, 103,104
 Ontario Northland Railway - Local 102
 Savage Alberta Railway – National Council 4000
 Toronto Terminal Railways - National Council 4000
 Via Rail Canada – National Council 4000, Local 100
 WABCO Stoney Creek – CAW Local 558

Marine transportation
 Bay Ferries, Saint John, NB-Digby, NS - Local 4404
 St. Lawrence Seaway – Local 4212
 Marine Atlantic

Other transportation
 Coast Mountain Bus Company, Greater Vancouver – Local 111, 2200
 CN Transportation Ltd. (CNTL – trucking) – National Council 4000
 CN Intermodal - National Council 4000
 DHL (Loomis) Courier – Local 114, 144, 4050, 4278, National Council 4000
 Durham Region Transit - Local 222
 Grand River Transit - Local 4304
 Laidlaw (carrier and transit) – Local 195, 4268
 Blue Line Taxi, Ottawa
 Waste Management Inc – Local 4050, 4209, 4268
 BC Transit, Victoria – Local 333
 Reimer Express Lines – Local 4209
 Brinks - CAW Local 504
 Securicor Cash Services – Local 114

Fisheries
 East Coast fish harvesters – FFAW/CAW
 East Coast fish plant workers – FFAW/CAW
 West Coast fish harvesters and fish plant workers (UFAWU)
 Great Lakes fish harvesters and fish plant workers – Local 444

Mining and smelting
 Xstrata – Local 598
Xstrata Kidd Metallurgical Site  – Local 599
 Alcan – Local 2301
 NVI Mining – Local 3019
 Windsor Salt Mine – Local 1959
 Gibraltar Mines – Local 3018

Hospitality and gaming
 Fairmont Hotels – Local 4050, 4275, 4276, 4534
 Delta Hotels
 Caesars Windsor – Local 444
 White Spot
 Radisson Hotels – Local 195, 3000, 4209
 Kentucky Fried Chicken – Local 3000
 Rocky Mountain Catering Co. Ltd. - National Council 4000
 Sheraton Hotels and Resorts
 Northern Lights Casino
 Marriott Hotels
 World Trade and Convention Centre Halifax - National Council 4000
 Great Blue Heron Casino Port Perry - Local 1090
 Elements Casino Brantford – Local 504

Retail and wholesale trade
 Atlantic Wholesalers (Loblaw Companies) Moncton - National Council 4000
 The Coca-Cola Company Local 973 (Brampton and Hamilton), Local 350 (Edmonton), Local 126 (Weston)
 Dominion Stores/A&P Canada/Superfresh – Local 414
 Food Basics – Local 414
 Loblaws – Local 414
 No Frills – Local 414
 PharmaPlus
 Results 360 Moncton Logistics Inc. (Freezer warehouse logistics) - Moncton - National Council 4000
 Sav-a-Centre – Local 414
 Sears Canada
 The Bay/Zellers – Local 240
 Valu-mart – Local 414
 Your Independent Grocer - Local 414

Health care
 Cape Breton District Health Authority
 St. Joseph's Health Care, London– Local 27
 Versa Care Homes – Local 302, 830, 2458
 London Health Sciences Centre
 Grand River Hospital – Local 302
 Camp Hill Medical Centre, Halifax
 Extendicare Homes – Local 302, 830, 1120, 2458
 Homes for the Aged, Thunder Bay– Local 229
 Glazier Health Centre, Oshawa- Local 1136
 Sault Area Hospitals – Local 1120
 Hôtel-Dieu Grace Healthcare,– Local 2458
 Windsor Regional Hospital – Local 2458
 Northwood Care, Halifax - CAW Local 4606
 St. Joseph's Care Group, Thunder Bay– Local 27, 229, 598, 1120
 Ornge – Local 2002

General services
 Allstream (formerly AT&T Canada)
 Green Shield Services– Local 240
 McMaster University - CAW Local 555
 Montreal-area auto dealerships
 Nova Scotia Federation of Labour Support Staff - National Council 4000
 Scandinavian Centre (B.C.)
 University of Manitoba - Local 3007
 University of Windsor – Local 2458
 Windsor Star – Local 240

Related subjects

Films

CAW President Bob White plays a major role in the 1985 documentary film: Final Offer by Sturla Gunnarsson & Robert Collision. It follows the 1984 contract negotiations with General Motors that saw the CAW's birth, and split with the UAW. It's an interesting look at life on the shop floor of a car factory, along with the art of business negotiation.

Donation to the University of Windsor
The CAW Local 200 donated over $4 million towards the renovation of the University of Windsor's student union building, which was renamed the CAW Student Centre in 1991 as recognition of the gift.

See also

CAW Locals

References

Further reading

External links
History of the CAW by Sam Gindin
Canadian Auto Workers Union – Web Archive created by the University of Toronto Libraries
The CAW and Magna: Disorganizing the Working Class by Sam Gindin
Critical view of the CAW and Magna Agreement by various authors.

 
International Metalworkers' Federation
International Transport Workers' Federation
Vehicle industry trade unions
Trade unions established in 1985
Defunct trade unions in Canada
Breakaway trade unions
1985 establishments in Canada
2013 disestablishments in Canada
Trade unions disestablished in 2013